The Digital, Culture, Media and Sport Select Committee, formerly the Culture, Media and Sport Select Committee, is one of the select committees of the British House of Commons, established in 1997. It oversees the operations of the Department for Digital, Culture, Media and Sport which replaced the Department for Culture, Media and Sport which also replaced the Department for National Heritage. The name was last changed on 3 July 2017.

Membership

As of 21 April 2022, the membership of the committee is as follows:

Changes since 2019

2017-2019 Parliament
The chair was elected on 12 July 2017, with the members of the committee being announced on 11 September 2017.

Changes 2017-2019

Changes
Occasionally, the House of Commons orders changes to be made in terms of membership of select committees, as proposed by the Committee of Selection. Such changes up to January 2013 are shown below.

Chair of the Digital, Culture, Media and Sport Select Committee

Election results
From June 2010 chairs of select committees have been directly elected by a secret ballot of the whole House of Commons using the alternative vote system. Candidates with the fewest votes are eliminated and their votes redistributed until one remaining candidate has more than half of valid votes. Elections are held at the beginning of a parliament or in the event of a vacancy.

See also
Parliamentary Committees of the United Kingdom

References

External links
 
Records of this Committee are held at the Parliamentary Archives 

Select Committees of the British House of Commons
1997 establishments in the United Kingdom